Mathieu Giroux (born 2 March 1986) is a Canadian speed-skater. He shared medals at team pursuit medals at world cup races in Calgary and Salt Lake City in 2009. He represented Canada at the 2010 Winter Olympics. On February 27, he won a gold medal in the team pursuit along with Denny Morrison and Lucas Makowsky.

References 

1986 births
Living people
Canadian male speed skaters
Speed skaters at the 2010 Winter Olympics
Speed skaters at the 2014 Winter Olympics
Olympic speed skaters of Canada
Olympic medalists in speed skating
Medalists at the 2010 Winter Olympics
Olympic gold medalists for Canada
Speed skaters from Montreal
World Single Distances Speed Skating Championships medalists
21st-century Canadian people